Harry and Louisiana Beall Paull Mansion, also known as "Morningside" and the Charles H. and Geraldine Beall House, is a historic home located at Wellsburg, Brooke County, West Virginia. It was built in 1907–1911, and is a stuccoed dwelling in the Mediterranean Revival style with Spanish Colonial Revival style elements.  It features a five bay portico with a hipped roof and eight columns.  It also has wrought iron porches and pan tile roofs. It was designed by noted Wheeling architect Frederick F. Faris (1870–1927).

It was listed on the National Register of Historic Places in 1986.

References

Houses on the National Register of Historic Places in West Virginia
Houses completed in 1911
Houses in Brooke County, West Virginia
National Register of Historic Places in Brooke County, West Virginia
Mediterranean Revival architecture in West Virginia
Spanish Colonial Revival architecture in West Virginia